Bolshaya Chiryadka is a rural locality (a village) in Kichmengskoye Rural Settlement, Kichmengsko-Gorodetsky District, Vologda Oblast, Russia. The population was 43 as of 2002.

Geography 
Bolshaya Chiryadka is located 27 km southwest of Kichmengsky Gorodok (the district's administrative centre) by road. Malaya Chiryadka is the nearest rural locality.

References 

Rural localities in Kichmengsko-Gorodetsky District